Benoît Kounkoud (born 19 February 1997) is a French handball player for Industria Kielce  and the French national team.

He participated at the 2016 European Men's Handball Championship.

References

1997 births
Living people
French male handball players
Sportspeople from Versailles, Yvelines
Expatriate handball players
French expatriate sportspeople in Poland
Vive Kielce players